Coca Carola was a Swedish Punk band formed in Åkersberga in 1986. Signed to the record label Beat Butchers, they were well known to the Swedish punk scene together with bands such as Asta Kask and Köttgrottorna. After more than 17 years together and seven albums, the band called it quits in 2004. The band has occasionally reunited since then, e.g. for the Peace & Love music festival in Borlänge, Sweden, in 2012.
In 2023, after a long hiatus, the band played in their Hometown of Åkersberga. They have planned to tour during 2023. 

Among other themes, the band made songs supporting sports club Djurgårdens IF.

Line-up:
Curre Sandgren - guitar & vocals
Jonas Winberg - guitar & backing vocals
Åke Norling - bass & backing vocals
Mårten Tolander - drums

Previous members:
Jonas Mellberg - bass & backing vocals

References

External links
 Discogs Page

Swedish punk rock groups